William MacKune (6 August 1882 – 31 August 1955) was a British gymnast who competed in the 1912 Summer Olympics. He was born in Liverpool. He was part of the British team, which won the bronze medal in the gymnastics men's team, European system event in 1912.

References

External links
profile

1882 births
1955 deaths
Sportspeople from Liverpool
British male artistic gymnasts
Gymnasts at the 1912 Summer Olympics
Olympic gymnasts of Great Britain
Olympic bronze medallists for Great Britain
Olympic medalists in gymnastics
Medalists at the 1912 Summer Olympics
20th-century British people